The Beauty Shoppers is a 1927 American silent comedy film directed by Louis J. Gasnier and starring Mae Busch, Doris Hill and Ward Crane.

Cast
 Mae Busch as Mabel Hines 
 Doris Hill as Peggy Raymond 
 Ward Crane as Sloane Maddox 
 Thomas Haines as Dick Merwin 
 Cissy Fitzgerald as Mrs. Schuyler 
 James A. Marcus as Sam Billings 
 Leo White as Achille 
 Dale Fuller as Olga 
 William A. Carroll as Mr. Schuyler 
 Lucio Flamma as Artist

References

Bibliography
 Munden, Kenneth White. The American Film Institute Catalog of Motion Pictures Produced in the United States, Part 1. University of California Press, 1997.

External links

1927 films
1927 comedy films
Silent American comedy films
Films directed by Louis J. Gasnier
American silent feature films
1920s English-language films
Tiffany Pictures films
American black-and-white films
1920s American films